Byzantine Church or Byzantine church may refer to:

 Historically, the State church of the Roman Empire
 particularly, Eastern Orthodox Church in the Byzantine Empire
 Any church that uses the Byzantine Rite a.k.a. Greek rite
 the Eastern Orthodox Church
 the 14 different Greek Catholic Churches, Eastern Catholic Churches that are using the Byzantine Rite
 Church buildings belonging to Byzantine architecture, usually built during the Byzantine Empire
 Post-Byzantine church buildings, built during the Post-Byzantine era (16th-18th c.)
 Modern church buildings belonging to the Byzantine Revival architecture also known as Neo-Byzantine architectural style
 Byzantine Church (Petra)

See also
Byzantine Empire
Byzantine (disambiguation)
Orthodox Church (disambiguation)
Persian Church (disambiguation)